The Miracle of the Slave (also known as The Miracle of St. Mark, 1548) is a painting by the Italian Renaissance artist Jacopo Tintoretto, and is now in the Gallerie dell'Accademia in Venice. It was originally commissioned for the Scuola Grande di San Marco, a confraternity in the city.

It portrays an episode of the life of Saint Mark, patron saint of Venice, taken from Jacobus de Voragine's Golden Legend. The scene shows, in the upper part, the saint intervening to make invulnerable a slave about to be martyred for his veneration of another saint's relics. All the figures are inscribed into an architectonic scenario.

Different influences on Tintoretto's art can be seen in the picture: while the anatomies are Michelangelo-like, the vivid and intense colors are typical of the Venetian School.

References

External links

 Official website
 Michael Levey, Tintoretto and the Theme of Miraculous Intervention, Journal of the Royal Society of Arts, 1965

Paintings by Tintoretto
1548 paintings
Paintings in the Gallerie dell'Accademia
Paintings depicting Mark the Evangelist
Slavery in art